Joshua Atkins (born 28 June 1992) is a New Zealand professional racing cyclist who last rode for Trek Livestrong U23. Atkins is the youngest rider to win the Tour of Southland.

Major results
2010
 6th Overall Tour of Southland
2011
 1st Overall Tour of Southland
1st Stage 5
 2nd Overall Tour of Tasmania
1st Stage 1 TTT
 1st Le Race
 4th National U23 Time Trial Championships
2012
 3rd NationalU23 Road Race Championships
2013
 3rd Overall Herald Sun Tour

References

External links

1992 births
Living people
New Zealand male cyclists
21st-century New Zealand people